These are the official results of the Men's 200 metres event at the 1995 IAAF World Championships in Gothenburg, Sweden. There were a total number of 72 participating athletes, with two semi-finals, four quarter-finals and nine qualifying heats and the final held on Friday 1995-08-11.

Final

Semi-finals
Held on Friday 1995-08-11

Quarterfinals
Held on Thursday 1995-08-10

Qualifying heats
Held on Thursday 1995-08-10

References
 Results

H
200 metres at the World Athletics Championships